The Calcutta Light Horse was raised in 1872 and formed part of the Cavalry Reserve in the British Indian Army. The regiment was disbanded following India's independence in 1947.

Operation Creek

On reserve since the Boer War, they are most noted for their part (with members of the Calcutta Scottish) in Operation Creek against the German merchant ship . The operation was organised by SOE's India Mission. It was kept covert, to avoid the political ramifications of contravening Portuguese neutrality in Goa, and was not revealed until thirty-five years afterwards, in 1978. The Ehrenfels was known to be transmitting information on Allied ship movements to U-boats from Mormugao harbour in Portugal's neutral territory of Goa.

The Light Horse embarked on the barge Phoebe at Calcutta and sailed around India to Goa. After the Ehrenfels was sunk in March 1943 by the team of British saboteurs, British intelligence dispatched an open message over the air falsely warning that the British would invade Goa. The crews of the other two German merchant ships in the harbour, the Drachenfels and Braunfels, received the message and scuttled their ships in Goa's harbour in the belief that they were protecting their ships from capture by the British. Italian ships in the harbour were also destroyed. In 1951 all three German merchant ships were salvaged.

As the end credits of the 1980 film The Sea Wolves state, "during the first 11 days of March 1943, U-boats sank 12 Allied ships in the Indian Ocean. After the Light Horse raid on Goa, only one ship was lost in the remainder of the month."

Members 
 Honorary Colonel Louis Mountbatten (1947)
 Colonel Archie Pugh 1890-1922 (1912-1922 as Colonel)
 Colonel Bill Grice
 Colonel John Pugh
 Corporal John Raymond
 Sir Owain Jenkins
 Ralph Wesley Dennis

Media 
In 1978 James Leasor wrote an account of the Ehrenfels mission in the book Boarding Party: The Last Charge of the Calcutta Light Horse. The film The Sea Wolves based on the book was made in 1980, with actors David Niven, Gregory Peck, Trevor Howard, Roger Moore and Patrick Macnee.

Legacy 
 The Light Horse Bar at the Saturday Club in Kolkata is named after the regiment. The club was founded in 1878 and is located on Wood Street. The bar houses a collection of regimental memorabilia.
 The Calcutta Light Horse Bar at the Oriental Club in London is named after the regiment.
 British Eventing presents a Calcutta Light Horse Trophy to the owner of the British horse gaining the highest number of points during a horse racing season.

Notes

References
 
  Republished in paperback as The Sea Wolves (1980) with a special foreword by Lord Mountbatten of Burma.

19th century in Kolkata
20th century in Kolkata
Calcutta
Military units and formations established in 1872
Indian World War II regiments
1872 establishments in India